Annalen may refer to:

 Annalen der Physik, a physics journal
 Crell's Annalen, a chemistry journal
 Liebigs Annalen, a chemistry journal
 Mathematische Annalen, mathematical journal